Alison Kitson FRCN is inaugural Vice President and Executive Dean of the College of Nursing and Health Sciences at Flinders University South Australia. She is also an Associate Fellow of Green Templeton College, Oxford, United Kingdom.

Education
Kitson is a Registered Nurse and holds a BSc in nursing and a DPhil in nursing from the Ulster University.

Professional life

Kitson is a health scientist and nursing leader whose innovative work on ways to close the knowledge to practice gap in healthcare has formed the basis for new ways of thinking about and exploring knowledge translation. She has demonstrated that effective knowledge translation requires the interplay of the nature of the EVIDENCE or knowledge being implemented, the CONTEXT into which the evidence is introduced and the way the evidence is FACILITATED. The conceptual framework, ‘Promoting Action on Research implementation in Health Systems’ (PARIHS) has shaped the way the scientific community has operationalised and studied knowledge translation. Before coming to Australia in 2007, Kitson had a long and successful career in executive leadership, education and research in the United Kingdom. She held a number of Executive Leadership positions at the Royal College of Nursing from 1997 to 2007 including Director of the Royal College of Nursing Institute and Executive Director Professional Nursing. As Director she was responsible for leading the professional nursing agenda and supporting the development of a number of innovative projects including the Clinical Leadership Programme. Kitson and her colleagues were acknowledged in the 2014 Academic Ranking of World Universities (Shanghai Jiao Tong University and Thomson Reuters) list of high cite world researchers for their work. Kitson is an active researcher in the fields of Fundamentals of Care, Translational Science and Evidence-Based Practice.

Since 2008 Kitson has been a member of the Editorial Boards of Nursing Research and Journal of Evidence-based Health Care. And from 1995 to 2003 was an Associate Editor and Board Member for Quality and Safety in Health Care. Since 2009 she has been a member of the Australian Nursing and Midwifery Accreditation Council. Kitson is Adjunct Professor Aalborg University, Denmark, Adjunct Professor Australian Health Services Institute, Queensland University of Technology, Australia, Honorary Professor Faculty of Health Sciences Oxford Brookes University Oxford, UK and Adjunct Professor Queensland University of Technology, Queensland, Australia.

Awards and honours

Kitson  is a fellow of the Royal College of Nursing (1991) and the American Academy of Nursing (2009). In 2002 she was awarded the DistinguishA prestigious prize awarded to Kitson for outstanding achievement and recognition of her contribution to nursing. In 2013 Kitson was awarded an Honorary Doctorate from the University of Malmo in Sweden for her contribution to nursing scholarship and leadership. In 2008 Kitson was awarded a Fellowship in Business Enterprise from Oxford Brookes University for founding and establishing the International Learning Collaborative in association with Green Templeton College, University of Oxford. See Awards and Honours. Kitson was elected Fellow of the Australian Academy of Health and Medical Sciences in 2015.

Publications

, Kitson has over 350 academic and professional articles listed on Google Scholar which have been cited over 18,000 times giving her an h-index of 55. Her three top cited articles are:

References

External links

Google Scholar

Year of birth missing (living people)
Living people
Nurses from Northern Ireland
Nursing researchers
Alumni of Ulster University
People educated at Portadown College
Fellows of the Australian Academy of Health and Medical Sciences
Fellows of the Royal College of Nursing
British nurses